Talk Shows USA is a talk radio syndicator owned by Skip Joeckel. Talk Shows USA primarily distributes two independently produced talk radio programs to individual stations.

Programs
Gun Talk 
The Money Pit Home Improvement Radio Show

External links
Talk Shows USA official website

American radio networks
American talk radio programs